Jake Siciliano  (born October 23, 1998) is an American actor best known for his roles in Shame (2011), Solitary Man (2009), The Taking of Pelham 123 (2009), and The Affair (2014–2019). In 2021 Jake Siciliano graduated from Columbia University and commissioned as an Officer In the United States Navy and is currently going through nuclear power school to become a submarine officer.

Career
A resident of Fairfield Township, Essex County, New Jersey, Siciliano began his career in 2008 and is best known for playing Martin Solloway on Showtime's The Affair.

Siciliano attended West Essex High School and was nominated in December 2016 by Representative Rodney Frelinghuysen to attend the United States Naval Academy.

Filmography

References

External links
 

1998 births
Living people
Place of birth missing (living people)
American male child actors
American male film actors
American male television actors
People from Fairfield Township, Essex County, New Jersey
West Essex High School alumni